Golisano is a surname. Notable people with the surname include:

Francesco Golisano (1930–1991), Italian film actor
Tarnica Golisano (born 1996), Australian rules footballer
Tom Golisano (born 1941), American billionaire businessman, philanthropist, and author